Dr. Madan G. Gandhi (31 August 1940 – 26 January 2019), a visiting fellow of St. John's College, Cambridge, was an educationalist, litterateur and poet.

Early childhood
Gandhi was born to Srimati Savitri Devi and Kewal Krishan on 31 August 1940 in Lahore. The family moved to India after the partition and Madan did his FSc from S.A. Jain College in 1958 and B.A. with Honours in English Literature from D.A.V. College, Ambala City in 1960.

Education 
He did his M.A. in English in 1964 from Panjab University, Chandigarh. His second master's degree was in Political Science from Punjabi University, Patiala in 1966 and Ph.D. in Political Science from Panjab University, Chandigarh in 1974.

Works
As an editor, he edited six volumes of the Collected Works of Lala Lajpat Raiit. He brought out the inaugural issue of the journal Earth Vision and, as editor of the South Asia News Letter, published 7 issues featuring the following volumes: 

 Sir Chhotu Ram: A Political Biography
 Gandhi & Marx 
 Gandhian Aesthetics 
 Modern Political Analysis 
 Modern Political Theory 
 Dialogue Among Civilizations 
 Globalization: A Reader 
 New Media: A Reader 
 Gopal Krishna Gokhle: A Political Biography 
 Creative Writing 
 Kundalini 
 Ashes & Embers 
 Haikus & Quatrains 
 Petals of Flame 
 Luteous Serpent 
 Meandering Maze 
 Freak Stair 
 Ring of Silence 
 Enchanting Flute 
 Shunayata in Trance 
 The Imperiled Earth 
 Ashtavakra Gita 
 Dattatreya Gita 
 Zen Gita 
 Gayatri
 Guru Nanak's Japuji - The Celestial ladder (2010); 
 Avadhut  Gita (2017); 
 Ewafe (2013); 
 Kundalini Awakening (2013); 
 Pravrajya Peals (2013); 
 Planet in Peril (2014); 
 Heavenly Hymns (2014); 
 Intercontinental Anthology of Poetry on Universal Peace (2014); 
 Burnished Beads (2015); 
 Dervishes' Dance (2016); 
 Bonsai Blossom (2016); 
 Arspoetica (2017); 
 Umbilical Chords : Anthology of Parents (2015); 
 Mandela Tributes (2014); 
 Jora Sanko (2014)

Works translated into other languages
The poetry of Madan G Gandhi was translated into several languages including Persian by Khadijeh Khavari, Najmeh Khavari with the title The Best Works of Madan G Gandhi, in Italian by Maria Miraglia, Tamil by Padmaja Narayanan as Petals of Flame, and Hindi by Jai Krishan Shukla Swar Se Saadh Anant.

Awards
Gandhi received a number of awards in his lifetime.

See also
 List of Indian writers

References

Notes

Mandela Tributes edited by Mutiu Olawuyi & Madan Gandhi, Global Fraternity of Poets Publishing, India 

20th-century Indian philosophers
Indian educational theorists
Indian writers
English translators
Nonviolence advocates
People from Lahore
1940 births
English male poets
English male non-fiction writers
2019 deaths
20th-century British translators